Michael McCarthy (born  in Birkenhead, Wirral, England) is a British environmentalist, naturalist, newspaper journalist, newspaper columnist, and author.

He was born the son of John and Norah McCarthy. He studied Modern Languages at the University of Liverpool.

He worked as a journalist first on the Bolton Evening News and then on the Daily Mirror. After 17 years in local and tabloid journalism, he moved first to The Times, then to The Independent on Sunday, and then to The Independent; he worked 27 years for those broadsheet newspapers.

He was the driving force behind a campaign by The Independent to identify the reasons for the decline of the British urban House sparrow; but the £5,000 prize offered by that newspaper has  not been awarded.

Awards 
 1991, 2003, 2006Environment Journalist of the Year, The British Environment and Media Awards
 2001Specialist Writer of the Year, British Press Awards
 2007Medal of the Royal Society for the Protection of Birds (RSPB), for outstanding services to conservation
 2010Silver Medal of the Zoological Society of London
 2011Dilys Breese Medal of the British Trust for Ornithology (BTO)

Publications

References

External links 
 Michael McCarthy on Twitter

Living people
Year of birth missing (living people)
People from Birkenhead
Alumni of the University of Liverpool
The Independent people
The Times journalists
Daily Mirror people